Serge Lama (born Serge Claude Bernard Chauvier on 11 February 1943 in Bordeaux) is a French singer and songwriter.

His most famous song is Je suis malade, written with Alice Dona. It has been written for Dalida and later performed by a number of artists including Lara Fabian.

In 1971, Lama represented France in the Eurovision Song Contest with the song Un jardin sur la terre, which was placed tenth.

Discography

Albums
1964 : L'humanité 
1964 : Bel Air 
1965 : La voix de son maitre 
1966 : 4 chansons d'Emile Stern et de Serge Lama 
1966 : La voix de son maître 
1967 : La voix son maître 
1968 : D'aventures en aventures 
1970 : Et puis on s'aperçoit 
1971 : Superman
1973 : Je suis malade
1974 : Chez moi
1975 : La vie Lilas 
1977 : L'enfant au piano 
1978 : Enfadolescence 
1979 : Lama chante Brel 
1980 : Souvenirs...Attention...Danger
1981 : Lama Père et fils 
1982 : De Bonaparte à Napoléon 
1984 : Napoléon 
1986 : Portraits de femmes 
1987 : Je t'aime 
1989 : A la vie, à l'aamour 
1992 : Amald'me 
1994 : Lama 
1999 : Serge Lama 
2001 : Feuilles à feuilles
2003 : Plurielles
2008 : L'Âge d'horizons
2012 : La balade du poète
2016 : Où sont passés nos rêves

Live albums 
1974 : À l’Olympia 74
1977 : Palais des congrès 77
1979 : Palais des congrès 79
1981 : Palais des congrès 81 - Avec simplicité
1988 : En concert au Casino de Paris 88
1996 : Lama l'ami Olympia
1998 : Symphonique Olympia 96
2003 : Un Jour Une vie Live Bercy 
2005 : Accordéonissi-mots

Theatre
1991: La Facture by Françoise Dorin (mise en scène Raymond Gérôme, Théâtre des Bouffes-Parisiens)
1995: Toâ by Sacha Guitry (mise en scène Stéphane Hillel, Théâtre Édouard VII)

References

External links
 Official website 
 

1943 births
Living people
Musicians from Bordeaux
French male singers
Eurovision Song Contest entrants of 1971
Eurovision Song Contest entrants for France